Phaula is a genus of beetles in the family Cerambycidae, containing the following species:

 Phaula antiqua Thomson, 1857
 Phaula atyroa Galileo & Martins, 2007
 Phaula bullula Martins, 1984
 Phaula lichenigera (Perty, 1832)
 Phaula microsticta (Lane, 1973)
 Phaula splendida (Galileo & Martins, 1987)
 Phaula thomsoni Lacordaire, 1872

References

Aerenicini